The 2020 Mayo Senior Football Championship was the 119th edition of the Mayo GAA's premier gaelic football tournament for senior clubs in County Mayo, Ireland. Sixteen teams competed with the winners not going on to represent Mayo in the Connacht Senior Club Football Championship, due to the latter competition's cancellation. In spite of the COVID-19 pandemic, the format for the championship was not altered. The championship started with a group stage and progressed to a knock out stage. The winners received the Paddy Moclair Cup.

The Neale made their first ever appearance in the top-flight of Mayo club football, having claimed the 2019 Mayo I.F.C. title with a final victory over Ballyhaunis.

Ballintubber were the defending champions for the second year running after they defeated Ballaghaderreen in the 2019 S.F.C. final.

The draw for the group stages of the championship were made on 9 March 2020 with the games commencing on 31 July 2020.

Team Changes
The following teams have changed division since the 2019 championship season.

To S.F.C.
Promoted from 2019 I.F.C.
 The Neale  -  (Intermediate Champions)

From S.F.C.
Relegated to 2020 I.F.C.
 Hollymount-Carramore

Clubs
The 2020 Championship was contested by 16 clubs: 4 of them from South Mayo, 4 from North Mayo, 4 from West Mayo, 4 from East Mayo.

Group stage
All 16 teams entered the competition at this stage. The top 2 teams in each group qualified for the quarter-finals while the bottom team of each group entered a Relegation Playoff. All teams played one home match, one away match and one match at a neutral venue. In the event of two teams finishing on the same points total, placings were decided by head-to-head record between the teams, then by scoring difference.

Group A

Round 1

Round 2

Round 3

Group B

Round 1

Round 2

Round 3

Group C

Round 1

Round 2

Round 3

Group D

Round 1

Round 2

Round 3

Knock-Out Stage

Quarter-finals

Semi-finals

Final

Notes

References

External links

Mayo Senior Football Championship
Mayo Senior Football Championship
Mayo Senior Football Championship
Mayo SFC